Dowrt Aghach (also Romanized as Dowrt Āghāch; also known as Dowrd Āghāj) is a village in Bastam Rural District, in the Central District of Chaypareh County, West Azerbaijan Province, Iran. At the 2006 census, its population was 32, in 6 families.

References 

Populated places in Chaypareh County